Isaac Henrique Sequeira (1738-1816) was a Portuguese Sephardic Jewish doctor.

Early life
Sequeira was born in Lisbon, and educated at Bordeaux and Leiden.

Career
Sequeira served as physician extraordinary to the Portuguese Embassy at the Court of St James's in London, and honorary physician extraordinary to the Portuguese prince regent.

He was a licentiate of the Royal College of Physicians (LCP) and practised medicine in Mark Lane.

Sequeira was painted in about 1775 by Thomas Gainsborough, one of his patients, and that oil painting now hangs in Madrid's Museo del Prado.

Personal life
Sequeira married Esther d'Aguilar (1739-1791), the daughter of Baron Diego Pereira d'Aguilar. In Jews and Medicine: An Epic Saga, Frank Heynick describes him as "wealthy and pompous".

On 21 April 1814, his daughter Lydia died.

His descendants include Jane Sequeira, a British doctor married to the financier Jonathan Ruffer, who collects Spanish old masters and Gainsborough paintings.

References

1738 births
1816 deaths
18th-century Jewish physicians of Portugal
European Sephardi Jews